Ingela Lind (25 February 1943 – 4 April 2021) was a Swedish journalist, art critic and non-fiction writer.

Career
Among her special interests were Virginia Woolf and the Bloomsbury Group, about which she wrote two books, Leka med modernismen from 2008, and Ta sig frihet. Bloomsbury, Indien och konsten att leva from 2018.

She died on 4 April 2021, 78 years old.

Selected works

References

1943 births
2021 deaths
Swedish journalists
Swedish art critics
Swedish non-fiction writers
21st-century Swedish women writers